The 2013 Austrian Figure Skating Championships took place between 19 and 22 December 2012 at the Albert-Schultz-Eishalle 3 in Vienna. Skaters competed in the disciplines of men's singles, ladies' singles, pair skating, and ice dancing on the senior level. The results were used to choose the Austrian teams to the 2013 World Championships and the 2013 European Championships.

Results

Men

Ladies

Pairs

Ice dance

External links
 official site
 2013 Austrian Championships results

2013
2012 in figure skating
Figure Skating Championships,2013